The 2010 Australian Drivers' Championship was a CAMS sanctioned national motor racing title with the championship winner receiving the 2010 CAMS Gold Star award. The 2010 championship was the 54th Australian Drivers' Championship and the sixth to be contested with open wheel racing cars constructed in accordance with FIA Formula 3 regulations.  The season began on 7 March 2010 at the Wakefield Park and finished on 24 October at Sandown Raceway after seven rounds across four different states with three races at each round.

Heading into the final round of the series, British Team BRM driver Ben Barker led the championship over New Zealand teammate Mitch Evans. Barker pulled ahead after taking five of the six wins available at Mallala and Morgan Park and following it up with another win at the Eastern Creek round. Evans was eight points behind Barker, despite missing the Symmons Plains round due to a Formula Abarth test at Misano. Australian driver Tom Tweedie remained in the championship hunt, despite competing in the older 2004 specification Dallara-Renault compared to the 2007 model Team BRM Dallara-Mercedes cars of Barker and Evans.

A pair of fourth places for Barker at Sandown saw the two Team BRM drivers tied on points, however the bonus point scored by Barker for the fastest lap in the final race giving him a one-point championship margin over Evans. Barker was also helped by the annulment of the second race after a serious incident involving Graeme Holmes and John Boothman. Tweedie finished third in the championship standings, 12 points behind Barker. Two other drivers claimed race wins; Andrew Waite who substituted for Evans at Symmons Plains and Tim Macrow who won both Sandown races in his only appearance of the season.

Barker also won the East Coast Challenge, which was contested over the final three rounds of the series. He scored 101 points ahead of Evans (94), Tweedie (80), Chris Gilmour (66), Zhang Shan Qi (38) and Tim Macrow (33).

Tom Tweedie won the National Class title having outscored his rivals at each of the seven rounds.

Classes
Each vehicle competing in the Championship was nominated into one of the following classes:
 Australian Formula 3 Championship – for automobiles constructed in accordance with the FIA Formula 3 regulations that applied between 1 January 2005 and 31 December 2007
 National Class – for automobiles constructed in accordance with the FIA Formula 3 regulations that applied between 1 January 1999 and 31 December 2004

There was an additional 'Invitation Class' in the regulations – for automobiles constructed in accordance with the appropriate regulations that applied in the year of manufacture, however no such vehicle took part during 2010 leaving the class redundant.

Points System
Points system was revised for 2010 although the changes are minor.

Drivers of cars from all three classes were eligible to score points towards the Australian Drivers' Championship. National Class and Invitation Class drivers were also eligible to score points towards their respective class awards.

Teams and drivers

The following teams and drivers competed in the 2010 Australian Drivers' Championship. Entries sourced in part from:

Race calendar

The championship was contested over a seven-round series with a round scheduled for Winton Motor Raceway being cancelled as a cost saving initiative.

The final three rounds of the series at Morgan Park, Eastern Creek and Sandown were packaged into a 'series within a series', labelled the East Coast Shootout.

Drivers Championship

See also
 Australian Drivers' Championship
 Australian Formula 3

References

External links
 Official Australian Formula 3 website
 2010 Championship standings as archived at www.webcitation.org on 9 November 2010

Australian Drivers' Championship
Drivers' Championship
Australian Formula 3 seasons
Australia
Australian Formula 3